How To Marry a Millionaire: Original Motion Picture Soundtrack is the official soundtrack album for the 1953 20th Century-Fox film How to Marry a Millionaire. The score was composed and directed by Alfred Newman, with incidental music by Cyril Mockridge. The album was originally released on CD by Film Score Monthly on March 15, 2001, as a limited edition of 3,000 copies, and then it was re-release on January 4, 2005.

Production 
The film features an actual overture after the fashion of a live theatrical extravaganza. The 20th Century Fox Orchestra is arrayed before the camera to perform "Street Scene," conducted by Newman. This serves to highlight CinemaScope's new four-track magnetic stereophonic sound system and widescreen visuals. The orchestra appears throughout in wide shots and there are no closeups of any of the players, nor of Newman. At the conclusion of "Street Scene," Newman turns to take a bow before launching into the "Main Title". The orchestra reappears briefly for the "End Title", also an arrangement of "Street Scene".

Newman originally composed "Street Scene" for the film version of Elmer Rice's 1931 play Street Scene, a portrayal of New York (which explains its distinctly Gershwinesque flavor, a la Rhapsody in Blue), and used it in numerous subsequent New York-based films (The Dark Corner, Kiss of Death, Cry of the City, I Wake Up Screaming, How to Marry a Millionaire). Much of the rest of the score for How to Marry a Millionaire consists of similarly familiar, preexisting compositions, including several pieces composed by George Gershwin.

The film's arrangement of Newman's "Street Scene" was performed in 1973 by National Philharmonic Orchestra, conducted by Charles Gerhardt, for the album Captain from Castille – Classic Film Scores of Alfred Newman, accompanied by a booklet in which Page Cook chronicles the background of the piece.

Release 
The music soundtrack from How to Marry a Millionaire was first released on CD by Film Score Monthly, as part of Film Score Monthly's series Golden Age Classics, on March 15, 2001, as a limited edition of 3,000 copies, and then it was re-release on January 4, 2005.

The album includes musical direction by Alfred Newman and incidental music by Cyril Mockridge, and was produced by Film Score Monthly's editor-in-chief and executive producer Lukas Kendall alongside producer/director Nick Redman.

The CD of How to Marry a Millionaire features the complete music recorded for the film in stereo including source music and unused cues. The booklet contains complete breakdowns of the songwriters represented and the orchestrators and arrangers utilized.

Track listing 
 All music composed and conducted by Alfred Newman.

Credits and personnel

Personnel 
Conductor – Alfred Newman, Lionel Newman
Orchestra Manager – Simon Waronker

Instruments and musicians 

Violin – Victor Arno, Sol Babitz, Israel Baker, Robert Barene, George Berres, Henry Camusi, Joachim Chassman, Dave Crocov, Adolph DiTullio, Peter Ellis, David Frisina, Benny Gill, Anatol Kaminsky, Murray Kellner, Eugene Lamas, Marvin Limonick, Paul Lowenkron, Marion McKinstry, Marshall Moss, Irma W. Neumann, Alex Pierce, Joseph Quadri, David Selmont, Paul C. Shure, Felix Slatkin
Viola – Edgardo A. Acosta, Myer Bello, Donald A. Cole, Joseph DiFiore, Alvin Dinkin, Louis Kievman, Alex Neiman, Robert Ostrowsky, Sven Reher
Cello – Joseph Coppin, Joseph DiTullio, Armand Kaproff, Raphael "Ray" Kramer, Leonard Krupnick, Kurt Reher, Harold Schneier
Bass – Abraham Luboff, Peter A. Mercurio, C. Magdelano Rivera, Meyer (Mike) Rubin, Alex Walden
Flute – Luella Howard, Barbara Moore (Putnam), Sterling D. Smith
Oboe – Arnold Koblentz, William Kosinski, Gordon Pope

Clarinet – Russell Cheever, Charles Gentry, Arthur Herfurt, Glen Johnston, Edward R. Miller, Abe Most, Ted Nash, Babe Russin, William A. Ulyate
Bassoon – Don Christlieb, Arthur Fleming, Glen Johnston
French Horn – Alfred Brain, Wendell Hoss, Sinclair Lott, Alan I. Robinson, Harry Schmidt, Claude Eugene "Gene" Sherry
Trumpet – Frank Beach, John Clyman, Jack R. Coleman, Conrad Gozzo, Manny Stevens
Trombone: Daniel D. Cerilly, Marlo Imes, Ray Klein, John Tranchitella, Lloyd E. Ulyate
Tuba – Clarence Karella
Piano – Urban Thielmann, Raymond Turner
Organ – Chauncey Haines
Guitar – Vito Mumolo
Harp – Anne Stockton (Mason)
Drums – Richard Cornell, Paul DeDroit, Edgar Forrest, Preston Lodwick, Cameron Maus, Harold L. "Hal" Rees

Credits and personnel adapted from the record label's official website.

References

External links 
 (via Film Score Monthly)

1953 soundtrack albums
Comedy film soundtracks